Maytag is a surname. Notable people with the surname include:

Frederick Louis Maytag I, founder of Maytag Corporation
Frederick Louis Maytag II, son of Elmer Henry Maytag
Frederick Louis Maytag III, nicknamed "Fritz", son of Frederick Louis Maytag II, and owner of the Anchor Brewing Company
Elmer Henry Maytag, son of Frederick Louis Maytag I
Lewis Bergman Maytag, son of Frederick Louis Maytag I